In Geneva on 15 January 2016, the FIM, ABC Communication and manufacturers reached a unanimous agreement for the creation of categories EnduroGP and Enduro2 from the 2017 season onward.

 EnduroGP:  Over 250cc - 2 or 4 stroke. No age limit and no entry limit
 Enduro2: Up to 250cc Moto - 2 or 4 stroke. No age limit and no entry limit

References

Motorcycle off-road racing series
World motorcycle racing series